TUBB1 is a gene that codes for the protein Tubulin beta-1 chain in humans.

References

Further reading